Our Time Will Come is the 19th album from German industrial rock band KMFDM. It was released on October 14, 2014 on Metropolis/KMFDM Records on both CD and vinyl.

Track listing

Personnel

KMFDM

 Lucia Cifarelli – composition, production
 Jules Hodgson – composition, engineering, mixing
 Sascha Konietzko – composition, engineering, mixing, production
 Andy Selway – composition
 Steve White – composition

Additional personnel
 Paul Aleinikoff – composition
 Annabella Asia – vocals (1)
 Bradley Bills – drums (3, 7), percussion (3, 7)
Mickie D (Michael Duwe) – solo guitar (5)
 Justin Gammon – layout
 Brian Gardner – mastering
 Tom Stanzel – bass (3, 10), composition, drums (3, 10), engineering, mixing, synthesizer (3, 10), vocals (3)
 William Wilson – composition, engineering, mixing, vocals (10)

Salvation

Salvation is a song by industrial band KMFDM from their album Our Time Will Come.

Track listing

References 

2014 albums
KMFDM albums
Metropolis Records albums
Albums produced by Sascha Konietzko